Namsskogan Familiepark is a zoo and amusement park in Namsskogan in Norway. The park is situated around the Tronestjønna, by the town Trones along E6. The park opened in 1989 and had more than 52,000 visitors in 2011. It is open every day in summer, and by appointment during winter.

Namsskogan Familiepark has more than 30 species of animals, including bears, Arctic fox and several types of livestock. The park also contains several amusement park rides.

External links
 (limited information in English)

Amusement parks in Norway
Zoos in Norway
Norwegian companies established in 1989
Amusement parks opened in 1989